Joyce Faunce née Harrowby (10 January 1921 - 27 December 2016) was a female swimmer who represented England.

Swimming career
In the 1938 British Empire Games, Faunce (then Harrowby) won both a bronze medal in the 440-yard freestyle relay, as well as competed in the 110-yard freestyle. She later moved to Australia in 1957 and continued to actively participate in the local swimming communities there, including Noosa Masters Swimming Club, where she served as secretary. By 2016, Faunce had set various national records for her age bracket and won several gold medals in 50-metres freestyle.

Personal life
During the Games in 1938, she lived as a student at York House, Wyvern Avenue, Belgrave in Leicester and later married Arthur Watson in 1944, whom she had three children with. After moving to Australia she remained there with her children until her death in 2016.

References

English female swimmers
Swimmers at the 1938 British Empire Games
Commonwealth Games medallists in swimming
Commonwealth Games bronze medallists for England
1921 births
2016 deaths
English swimmers
Medallists at the 1938 British Empire Games